Jerry Boniface known by the alias Mesen Selekta (born 12 December 1989, Dar es Salaam), known by his stage name Mesen, is a Tanzanian record producer,Film director , rapper and entrepreneur. He is the founder and current CEO of De Fatality International. Mesen Selekta is the founder and member of the music group Black & White. He has produced albums for and overseen the careers of many rappers, including Joh Makini, Nikki wa pili, Izzo Biznes, Pah One, G nako, Nakaaya, Roma and Country Boi. He is credited as a key figure in the popularization of English rap in Tanzania, which is a Swahili speaking nation.

Early life 
Mesen Selekta places his interests in music at the age of 14 when his father bought him a piano and a found a piano teacher. At the age of 17 Mesen attended Mukidoma Secondary school where he met new friends and roommates Barnabas Shegella aka Bonke, Kumbuka Mwakibinga, Frank Muya aka Zpower but next year they were joined by Martin Thadeus aka Konsciouz who became a new member. They had a short-lived group named X members by Mesen himself. Mesen wrote many songs including gospels and RNB this made him the most popular X members member. Mesen dropped out of school to pursue his music career. He released "Baby" by had little market success and airplay then its when he turned to production. After lot of complication in life he met Kid who paved way for his success.
He officially began his career in music as an assistant music producer at Kama Kawa records in Dar es Salaam, Tanzania. He worked there for a period of two years before leaving to India to further his studies at Punjab College. His Riz One instrumental for Izzo Bizness, released under MJ Records, led the rapper Izzo Bizness to become one of the best-selling Tanzanian performing artists of 2009, to get nominations for major awards and meet the son of the President of the republic of Tanzania Mr Ridhiwan Kikwete.

Portfolio
Stimu Zimelipiwa – Joh Makini (2010) (kili awards won best hiphop song of year)
Tanzania – Roma (2008)
Tanzania – Kala Jeremiah (2008)
Niaje ni vipi – Joh ft nikki (2008)
Mziki huu – Izzo Bizness (2008)
Kisingeli – Mesen Selekta (2016)
Kiujamaa – Nikki wa pili (2011)
RiziOne – Izzo Bizness (2011) (kili awards 3x nom)
Sina Imani - Shetta Feat. Rich Mavoko (2013)
Chukua Time - Suma Mnazaleti Feat. Ommy Dimpoz  (2012)
 Kanyaboya – Mesen Selekta (2015)
 Kazi Kazi – Prof. Jay ft. Sholo Mwamba (2016)
Nyamu – Mesen Selekta (2012)
Mbulula - Juru (2013)
 Nimempata – Pam D feat. Mesen Selekta (2015)
 Hainaga Ushemeji – Man Fongo (2016)
 Chata - Mesen Selekta (2017)
 Dab Singeli - TsGang Ft Sholo Mwamba (2017)
Mesen Selekta - Kinanda Remix ft Target and MusiholiQ(South Africa)- (2018)

References

Tanzanian musicians
1989 births
Living people